The 2015 South Coast blackout was a power outage that affected more than 710,000 residents living in the Lower Mainland  and Vancouver Island regions of the Canadian province of British Columbia. It was the largest blackout event in BC Hydro history. The blackout was a result of windstorm that hit the South Coast on August 29–30, 2015, which shut down a generator and wiped out a power grid in the Lower Mainland.

The hardest hit areas were Abbotsford, Coquitlam, Langley, Pitt Meadows, Port Coquitlam, Port Moody and Surrey. The blackout lasted more than 72 hours for some neighbourhoods in these municipalities.

Blackout

The blackout began with a windstorm that knocked over trees and blew away branches sometime in the early morning of August 29, 2015. Later around noon, a generator blew out, with most of the electricity going out in neighbourhoods in Coquitlam, Port Moody, and Port Coquitlam, with certain buildings equipped with partial emergency lighting and businesses closing for the day as a result of the blackout. Reports also surfaced that people saw sparks blow up on cables in neighbourhoods. Wind speeds reached 90 to 100 km/h at the time of the blackout. People who were desperate of getting warm food either had to travel to nearby Burnaby to order, resulting in cramped lineups. The same also happened in select businesses in Port Coquitlam, with cramped lineups also occurring there. The next day, BC Hydro stated that the power to the homes should resume by midnight August 31, 2015, but resumed 6 hours earlier than most expected. However, some local areas of BC took longer to regain power.

References

Disasters in British Columbia
2015 in British Columbia
2015 disasters in Canada
Greater Vancouver
Power outages
Electric power in Canada
August 2015 events in Canada
2015